La Dorada may refer to:
La Dorada, Caldas, a municipality in the Department of Caldas, Colombia.
La Dorada, Catamarca, a municipality in Catamarca Province in northwestern Argentina.